Hylophilodes tsukusensis is a moth in the family Nolidae first described by Kikujiro Nagano in 1918. It is found in Japan and Taiwan.

The wingspan is 33–36 mm.

The larvae have been recorded feeding on Fagus species.

References

Moths described in 1918
Chloephorinae
Moths of Japan